Jaan Treial (31 January 1896 Vara, Tartu County – 11 January 1918) was an Estonian politician. He was a member of Estonian Provincial Assembly. When he died, his position in the assembly was replaced by Alma Ostra-Oinas.

References

1896 births
1918 deaths
Members of the Estonian Provincial Assembly
People from Peipsiääre Parish